The Mindanao white-eye (Heleia goodfellowi), also known as the black-masked white-eye, is a species of bird in the family Zosteropidae. The specific epithet honours British zoological collector Walter Goodfellow.  It is endemic to the Philippines. Its natural habitat is subtropical or tropical moist montane forest.

Description and Taxonomy 
EBird describes the bird as "A fairly small bird of montane forest on Mindanao. Olive on the upperparts, darker in the wing and tail, with a blackish mask, dingy yellow underparts, and a pale gray throat. Usually found in mixed-species flocks with Cinnamon ibon, Warbling white-eye, and Black-and-cinnamon fantail. Similar to Yellow-bellied whistler, but usually found at higher elevations, and has a thinner bill and dark mask. Gives a musical whistle and also a harsh grating call."

Subspecies 
Three subspecies are recognized:
 Heleia goodfellowi goodfellowi - Central and South Mindanao
 Heleia goodfellowi gracilis- North East Mindanao
 Heleia goodfellowi malindangensis- West Mindanao

and an undescribed subspecies in South East Mindanao

Habitat and Conservation Status 

It inhabits tropical moist primary and secondary sub-montane and montane forest and forest edge from 1,250 - 2,400 meters above sea level.

IUCN has assessed this bird as a least-concern species. Despite a limited range, it is said to be locally common in its range. As it occurs in rugged and inaccessible mountains, this has allowed a large portion of its habitat to remain intact. It is also able to tolerate degraded forest. However, the population is still said to be declining, as it is still affected by habitat loss through deforestation, mining, land conversion and slash-and-burn - just not to the same extent as lowland forest.

References

Mindanao white-eye
Birds of Mindanao
Mindanao white-eye
Taxonomy articles created by Polbot